Professor Aliyu Usman El-Nafaty MBBCH, FWACS, FICS, OFR is a Professor of Obstetrics & Gynaecology and Vice-chancellor of Gombe State University.

Early life
El-Nafaty was born on the 25th of December 1960 in the town of Nafada, Gombe State.

Career 
He worked at University of Maiduguri as a lecturer in 1989, and was promoted through the ranks to a Professorship 
Prior to his appointment as the Vice Chancellor of Gombe State University in 2019, Prof. Aliyu Elnafaty held the position of Medical Director of the Federal Medical Centre Gombe 2002-2010, during his tenure the Hospital was transformed to an efficient and robust Health Service delivery Centre that won the Prestigious Ministerial Prize of Honor as the best Medical Centre in the Federation by 2007. He also served as the Deputy Provost, Ag. Provost and Deputy Vice-Chancellor of the University. 

The Vice Chancellor co-authored the Book titled: Early Detection and Management of Pre-Eclampsia/Eclampsia for Health Workers in Developing Countries. In addition, he also Published many Journal Articles on the same subject.

Fellowship 

El-Nafaty obtained the Fellowship of the West African College of Surgeons in 1994, and was Conferred with the Fellowship of International College of Surgeons.

He also won the prestigious John D. and Catherine T. MacArthur Foundation Research Grant on Leadership Development in 1996.

References 

1960 births
Living people
People from Gombe State
Academic staff of the University of Maiduguri
Nigerian obstetricians
Nigerian medical writers
Nigerian surgeons